Lookout for Hope may refer to:

 Lookout for Hope (Bill Frisell album), 1988
 Lookout for Hope (Jerry Douglas album), 2002